Branko Radović (born 6 July 1993) is a Serbian footballer, playing for Sloboda Užice.

Club career
Born in Užice, Radović passed all youth categories of the local club Sloboda. He started his senior career with Sloga Požega where he made 19 appearances in the Serbian League West. Playing for the club, he also scored his first senior goal in 3–1 away win against Sloga Petrovac na Mlavi on 21 April 2012. Later he moved to Sevojno, where he spent a period between 2012 and 2015. He also played a half-season in early 2016 with Budućnost Arilje. In summer same year, he returned to his home club Sloboda Užice. He made his debut for the club in 18 fixture match of the 2016–17 Serbian First League season, against Zemun. Later, in April 2017, Radović also made an appearance in the Serbian Cup match against Čukarički.

References

External links
 
 
 

1993 births
Living people
Sportspeople from Užice
Association football forwards
Association football utility players
Serbian footballers
FK Sevojno players
FK Sloboda Užice players
Serbian First League players